Diadromus pulchellus is a species of parasitoid wasp in the family Ichneumonidae. Its host is the leek moth, Acrolepiopsis assectella.

References

Ichneumonidae
Insects described in 1845